Sogang University (SU, Hangul: 서강대학교 Hanja: 西江大學校, literally "West River University") is one of the most prestigious private research universities in Seoul, South Korea. It was established in 1960 by Fr. Theodore Geppert, SJ with the Wisconsin Province of the Society of Jesus. Sogang is the oldest Jesuit institution of higher education in South Korea, and it has been ranked as one of the top 3 Catholic universities in Asia.

History

Beginnings
At the initiative of the Catholic Hierarchy of Korea, Pope Pius XII gave assurance that a Catholic institution of higher learning would be established in Korea. In 1948 he entrusted the task to the Society of Jesus. In October 1954 Jesuit Fr. Theodore Geppert, SJ from Sophia University of Tokyo came to Korea in search of a suitable site to establish a Jesuit college. In February 1955 Jean-Baptiste Janssens, SJ, the twenty-seventh Superior General of the Society of Jesus, assigned the task of establishing the college to the Wisconsin Province of Jesuits. Fr. Leo Burns, SJ, Superior of the Wisconsin Province of the Society of Jesus, came to Korea and, with the Korean Catholic Hierarchy, began negotiations with the Syngman Rhee government for the establishment of a liberal arts college. In January 1957 the Society of Jesus purchased a property of 67,075 pyong (217,323 sq. meters, 53 acres) at Nogosan, Sinsu-dong, Mapo-gu, Seoul. The site was prepared for construction of an Administration Building, which was completed in November 1959. Sogang College was opened in 1960 and was granted research university status in 1970.

Development
The 1979 Nobel Peace Prize Laureate Mother Teresa visited Sogang in May 1981 and gave addresses in the auditorium and at the basketball court, appealing for all to practice a charity that is universal.

In 1984 the Korean Catholic Church celebrated its bicentennial. For the celebration Pope John Paul II visited Korea on May 5, meeting with priests along with men and women religious in the gymnasium and with Korean intellectuals in the auditorium.

On April 24, 1985, Sogang's 25th anniversary was commemorated, with Sogang's founder Fr. Geppert, SJ as a special guest.

University symbol and slogan
The cardinal red university color symbolizes love, the Holy Spirit, martyrdom, loyalty, and victory. The silver chevron comes from the first letter 'ㅅ' of 서강 (Sogang), representing the intellectual spirit of Sogang and an ivory tower. The "IHS" comes from the first letters of the Greek name  for Jesus and is also found on the seal of the Society of Jesus, the Catholic religious order that founded the university. The medieval crown stands for the Virgin and Trinity, symbolizing wisdom. Sogang University also has a famous slogan which is: Be as Proud of Sogang as Sogang is Proud of You (Korean: 그대 서강의 자랑이듯, 서강 그대의 자랑이어라).

Reputation
Admission to Sogang University is highly selective and competitive in South Korea. Sogang's freshman intake belongs to the top 1% of their high school academic performance in the country, and the university is widely regarded as one of the top private universities and one of the most prestigious elite schools in South Korea. However, the university's ranking lags behind its reputation and evaluation results because it has no medical school and fewer students than some other Korean universities.

Rankings
QS World University Ranking 2022: #494
QS WUR By Subject Ranking 2021: #201–250
QS Graduate Employability Ranking 2021: #301–500
QS Asian University Rankings 2021: #78

Sogang Business School
In October 2009 Sogang University received accreditation in business from the Association to Advance Collegiate Schools of Business (AACSB) .

It is among the top five business schools in Korea. Located near the financial hub in Seoul, it had the highest job-landing ratio for undergraduates among universities in Korea in 2006, 2007 and 2008: the percentages of employment in major companies measured by the Ministry of Education have been 55.1%, 53.3% and 54.9% for these years.

The "Sogang school of economics"
The university has contributed significantly to the rapid economic growth of Korea during the last six decades since 1960. Faculty members have been deeply involved in the design of Korea's early economic development model through top-level cabinet positions in the government. Due to these important engagements, a group of economists affiliated with the university and engaged in policy-making came to be called the "Sogang School." Based on its reputation, the school has consistently attracted young talent of the highest caliber, mostly from the top 1% in the national college entrance exam. Reflecting its excellent research capacity, the Economics Department has been recognized by RePEc as near the top in Korea in international journal publications.

Sogang Korean Language Education Center 
Sogang Korean Language Education Center (KLEC) was established in 1990 with the goal to popularize and spread the Korean language and Korean culture throughout the world.

Since its establishment, over 30,000 students from overseas have learned about Korean culture and language by participating in its programs. Currently, an average of 3,500 students register for the Korean Language Education Center every year.

Notable alumni and faculty

Alumni

Politics

Park Geun-hye, 11th president of the Republic of Korea
Park Young-sun, minister of SMEs and startups (2019–present); former member of the National Assembly (2008–2020)
Suh Byung-soo, member of the National Assembly; former mayor of Busan (2014–2018)
Kim Young-joo, member of the National Assembly; former minister of employment and labor (2017–2018)
Lee Hae-sik, member of the National Assembly
Yang Yiwonyoung, member of the National Assembly
Cheong Yang-seog, former member of the National Assembly (2016–2020)
Kim Tae-young, former minister of national defense (2009–2010)
Jeon Yeo-ok, former member of the National Assembly (2012)
Choi Soon-hong, former United Nations chief information technology officer

Business
Kwon Hyuk-bin, founder & CEO, Smilegate Holdings
Kim Suk-won, former chairman of SsangYong Group

Academia
Lee Bae-yong, former president of Ewha Womans University (2006–2010)
Yoon Min-joong, chemist

Literature
Ahn Jung-hyo, novelist, translator
Baik Sou-linne, author
Choi Si-han, writer
Hwang Ji-u, poet, art critic
Kim Kyung-ju, poet
Kim Seung-hee, poet, essayist, novelist
Kim Won-u, novelist
Lim Chul-woo, writer

Broadcasting and entertainment

Notable faculty
 Choe Yun, professor of French literature
 Almas Heshmati, professor of economics
 Yoon Kyung-byung, professor of chemistry
 Brother Anthony, emeritus of English literature
 Yoon Nung-min, former professor of chemistry
 Lee Ki-baek, former professor of history
 Nam Duck-woo, former professor of economics, former prime minister of South Korea
 Chang Young-hee, professor of English literature, columnist, motivational writer
 Kim Chong-in, former professor of economics; former member of the National Assembly
 Sohn Hak-kyu, former professor of political science; former governor of Gyeonggi Province, former minister of health and welfare; former member of National Assembly
 Cho Yoon-je, former professor of international studies; former South Korean ambassador to the United States

Controversies
In July 2010 four professors in the department of Business Administration were dismissed after exposing the mishandling of grant funds by a fellow professor. The professors appealed to the Ministry of Education, Science, and Technology. Neither the professors nor the university were satisfied with the Appeal Commission's ruling, with both sides filing suit.

See also
 List of Jesuit sites

References

External links
  Sogang University Official web site

 
Universities and colleges in Seoul
Catholic universities and colleges in South Korea
Jesuit universities and colleges
Mapo District
Educational institutions established in 1960
Association of Christian Universities and Colleges in Asia
1960 establishments in South Korea
Private universities and colleges in South Korea